Huntsville is a small unincorporated community in Yadkin County, North Carolina, United States.  The community was formerly chartered in 1792 by Charles Hunt of Salisbury, NC and was chartered again in 1822 . Not to be confused with the other Huntsville, North Carolina which is a small town not listed on maps. It is mostly known to the locals as Huntsville and has a Huntsville Volunteer Fire Department, and Huntsville Community Center which is in front of a baseball/softball field which is home to Huntsville little league.

History
European settlers were drawn to the area as early as the 1740s because of the Shallow Ford, a natural gravel roadway under the Yadkin River. The Shallow Ford, which became part of the Great Wagon Road, was the only place in the vicinity that was shallow enough for heavy wagons to cross.

When a road was extended from the Moravian settlement of Bethabara to the Shallow Ford in 1753, the village just west of the river became a frequent stop on the stagecoach trail. From the crossing, settlers could continue to Salisbury and Charlotte then on as far south as Georgia. In 1770, the Shallow Ford became part of the western expansion as well, when the Mulberry Fields Road, and what later became known as the  Daniel Boone Trail to Kentucky, opened.

The area was first known as the Bryan Settlement after Morgan Bryan, a Pennsylvania Quaker who settled in the frontier three miles (5 km) downstream of the Shallow Ford in 1748. Edward Hughes – who may have been the first settler in the region, arriving as early as 1747 – established a tavern and inn in the area.

Revolutionary War activity
The Battle of Shallow Ford was fought on October 14, 1780, between 400 Tories and 300 Patriots from North Carolina and Virginia. The company of Tories was trying to travel to Charlotte to join General Cornwallis.

Patriot Col. Joseph Williams, who lived nearby, called together his men and set up an ambush at the ford. As the Tories, led by Colonel Gideon Wright and his brother Captain Hezikiah Wright, prepared to cross the river, they were ambushed. The conflict was short, hard and decisive. The Tories, badly beaten, fled and scattered.

Fifteen casualties were reported, fourteen Tories and one Patriot, Henry Francis, a captain in the Virginia militia. A tombstone at the Battle Branch, the site of the skirmish, honors Francis. The Big Poplar Tree, a landmark at the site, is believed to have been shot out during the battle.

The battle shares its name with a play written by Ed Simpson, a native of nearby Lewisville.

On February 7, 1781, General Cornwallis, in pursuit of American General Nathanael Greene, led his troops across the Yadkin River at the Shallow Ford.

Establishment of town
In 1792, Charles Hunt purchased  and began to lay out 111½ acre lots for the town. A post office was established in the town in 1795. Several stores also were established, including the Red Store, which was operated by Jacob Clingman, father of Brigadier General Thomas Lanier Clingman, who was born near Huntsville.

The Rev. Peter Eaton, who represented the area in the North Carolina Senate, petitioned to change the town's name to Eatonsville in 1807. The motion failed.  In 1851, the village had 79 lots with a total value of $5,048.

Civil War skirmish
In the final days of the Civil War, Union troops under Gen. George Stoneman moved toward the Shallow Ford. About dawn on April 11, 1865, Stoneman's men met up with Confederate Home Guard. The guard, taken by surprise, put up some resistance, then fled, reportedly leaving behind a hundred new muskets. The militia had set up breastworks trenches along the west side of the river. However, the Union troops had crossed north of the site.

Stoneman's men looted and burned much of the village, including the Red Store, before heading south toward Mocksville and Salisbury.

Later years
In the 20th century, the Shallow Ford became less important as newer highways bypassed the community, and it began a slow decline. In 1920, a bridge was built north of the  Shallow Ford, which ended the use of the ford.

Today, the area is primarily rural with a few historic homes surviving. However, it has experienced growth recently because of its proximity to Winston-Salem.

The White House was listed on the National Register of Historic Places in 1982.

Notable people
 Thomas Lanier Clingman, North Carolina Congressman, United States Senator and General of the Confederate States Army was born here.
 Richard Irving Dodge, United States Army officer and author.
 Rev. Peter Eaton, a Baptist minister and merchant. He was elected to the North Carolina Senate in 1804.
 Richard Clauselle Puryear, a U.S. congressman from 1853–1857.

References

External links
 The Shallow Ford of the Yadkin River
 "Happy Hunting Near Huntsville," Roam Magazine article on Huntsville attractions
 Yadkin County Chamber of Commerce, based in Yadkinville

Notes

Unincorporated communities in Yadkin County, North Carolina
Unincorporated communities in North Carolina
Populated places established in the 1740s